Emel Aykanat (born 8 June 1975), better known as Emel, is a Turkish-Swiss singer. Her first big success came with the single Somebody Dance with Me with DJ BoBo.

Career
At the age of 17 years, she toured as a background singer with Six Was Nine a German pop and soul band through Europe.

Aykanat's first success was in 1993 as a female voice in the song Somebody Dance with Me by DJ BoBo which appeared in various clubs. Her first album Can we Talk appeared in 1996 and reached 26th in the Swiss charts.

In 2001, Aykanat was part of a duet with the Swiss rapper Bligg.

In 2004, Aykanat was the Swiss spokesperson for Eurovision Song Contest 2004. Aykanat was also part of the Swiss jury in the Eurovision Song Contest 2009.

The current album Come into my life was the first German-language album in 2007.

She entered the Swiss selection for the Eurovision Song Contest 2012, with a song called "She".

Discography

Singles
1996: "Sunshine"
1997: "On And On"
1999: "Everything"
2001: "Alles scho mal ghört" (with Bligg)
2008: "Wenn es regnet"
2011: "She"

Albums
1996: Can We Talk
1999: Free
2007: Komm in mein Leben

Chart positions

References

External links
Myspace Profile
Biography

1975 births
Living people
Eurodance musicians
Swiss pop musicians
Swiss people of Turkish descent
20th-century Swiss women singers
21st-century Swiss women singers